Skutevika is a neighbourhood in the city of Kristiansand in Agder county, Norway. The neighborhood is located in the borough of Vågsbygd and in the district of Voiebyen. Skutevika is north of Kroodden, south of Møviklia, east of Steindalen, and west of Spinneren.

Transport

References

Geography of Kristiansand
Neighbourhoods of Kristiansand